Greenstein Har-Gil, Landscape Architecture Ltd  is an Israeli landscape architecture firm.
 
The firm was established in 1988 and is located on Mount Carmel in Haifa. Greenstein Har-Gil is involved in a wide range of projects, among them: urban parks, promenades, urban renewal, "nature in the city", water sites, cultural landscapes and heritage sites, nature reserves, national parks, regional planning, master plans, landscape restoration of infrastructures such as roads, railways, gas lines and architectural design of bridges and road structures.

The firm
Greenstein Har-Gil engages in a variety of planning and design aspects. Firm teams led, among others, landscape master plans of regions such as the Gilboa Mountains, Master plan for Taninim and Kziv rivers, The firm participated in preparing the master plans of cities such as Ashdod, Kiryat Bialik, Yokneam, Upper Nazareth, Umm Al-Fahm, Usfia, and Tamra.

The firm engages in landscape planning of national infrastructures such as sections of Cross Israel Highway, the new Acco- Karmiel and Haifa -Beit Shan rail ways, in restoration of quarries and landscape planning of power and energy stations, including Alternative and renewable energy.

Greenstein Har-Gil was responsible for many urban projects among them neighborhoods, pedestrian streets and main Piazzas, such as the entrance square to the government buildings in Haifa. The firm specializes in planning projects of urban restoration, such as the development of the Haifa German Colony, Haifa Axis and landscape development of Wadi Salib in Haifa. The firm participated in planning archeological sites and natural reserves such as the Banias and Tel Dan Reserves, in planning parks and urban and coastal promenades, such as the Haifa Hecht Park and Shikmona promenade, the Zichron Ya'akov Moshava Park and the kiriat bialik Habanim Park.

Firm teams participated in open and invited competitions in Israel and international, and were awarded first prizes and citations, among them The Azrieli prize for urban planning for the German Colony in Haifa and the Tel-Aviv Municipality Karavan Prize for Park Hecht in Haifa.

The Partners 
Architect Daphna Greenstein and Dr. Gil Har-Gil, the firm owners, hold a Bachelor, Master and Doctorate degrees in the various planning and design professions – urban and regional planning, architecture and landscape architecture. They have over twenty five years of professional experience in Israel and the United States. Landscape Architect Hila Rotem Halevy, Landscape Architect Tali Mark and Landscape Architect Ofer Mor are partners in the firm.
In addition to their professional work at the office, architect Daphna Greenstein and Dr. Gil Har-Gil teach courses in landscape architecture at the Faculty of Architecture and Town Planning at the Technion, they are active in professional associations and are executive members of the Israeli Association of Landscape Architects. Daphna served as chairperson of the Israeli Association of Landscape Architects in 2001 to 2004. Gil served as chairman of the Israeli Association of Landscape Architects in 2009 to 2012. In 2012 Dr. Gil Har-Gil was appointed Associate Professor at the Faculty of Architecture and Town Planning at the Technion.

Projects

Hecht Park, Haifa 

"Hecht Park" of about 75 dunam, is the largest intensive park in Haifa and is a component in the sequence of Haifa's coastal promenade. The park includes varied flora areas and emphasized the use of natural flora matching the existing coastal flora of the area. Furthermore, in the park there are wide lawns for public use.
The park addresses a diverse target of users: families, children, adults,  open air sports, bicycle riders, joggers etc. 
The park is located along the southern entry to the city and was built by the initiative of Haifa Municipality, in co-operation with Hecht Foundation.

Shikmona Coastal Park and Promenade, Haifa 

Haifa Shikmona coast is a narrow strip of about 80 dunam, divided by the rail way from park Hecht. Shikmona coast is a National Park and a Marine Nature Reserve. Tel Shikmona is located at the north end of the park.
Much effort was taken to preserve the existing coastal flora, as well as to reintroduce the local flora which had been typical of this area in the distant past.
The coastal complex of Hecht Park and Shikmona Coastal Park is designated to respond to the ever-growing needs for recreation activities, exposing the city residents and its visitors to the ecological, landscape and archaeological values of this unique shore.	
Shikmona Coastal Park includes a pedestrian promenade of about 1 km and a bicycle path of 1.6 km. The park was erected by the initiative of Haifa Municipality, with the assistance of a contribution of the Electric Company.

Israel Cross Highway (no. 6), Ramot Menashe section

 
This section of the Israel Cross Highway passes through a highly sensitive landscape of Oak hills. The road crosses also 11 river beds some of which are Nature Reserves.
The landscape restoration concept was of an ecological-landscape, reconstructing the landscape, which had existed prior to carrying out the road, and blended into the natural and agricultural landscapes around the road. The plant restoration complements the "external" landscape and "interweaves" the patterns of the landscape around. Seeds, and geophytes were gathered, prior to carrying out the works, for sprouting local habitats. The use of local flor enables to reduce the water quantity required for irrigation and emphasizes the seasonal change experience of the country's landscapes.
Greenstein Har-Gil Firm "accompanied" the engineering planning from its early stages. The landscape design included a landscape analysis, participating in determining the horizontal and vertical road route in order to minimize the environmental damage, examining the various alternatives and determining the location and length of the bridges and tunnels as well as planning the interchanges. Due to the landscape sensitivity of the area and the nature of the planning process, the landscape and environmental aspects received particularly great emphasis and importance and affected significantly the engineering of the road. Erecting the road was managed by Cross Israel Highway Company.

Awards and Competitions 
Over the years the firm staff has gained recognition and appreciation for many projects:
 Karavan Award for landscape architecture, Tel-Aviv municipality, 2009, for Hecht Park in Haifa
 Azrieli Urban Planning Prize, Council for a Beautiful Israel, 2006, for the German Colony, Haifa in Haifa
 The Magshim Award, the Council for a Beautiful Israel, 2001, for the German Colony in Haifa
 A. Lipschitz Haifa Municipality Award, Municipality of Haifa, 1999, for landscape planning of Ben-Gurion Avenue in Haifa and an impressive connection of Haifa's key landscape assets.
 Association of Architects and Planners, Certificate of Appreciation for "professional contribution in the field of Landscape Architecture", 1998, on the occasion of fifty years of Israeli Architecture.
 Ford Foundation Award, 1998, in the field of heritage and conservation.
 Winning (First Place), Invited Competition for Planning the Ben-Gurion Axis, 1995, at the German Colony in Haifa.

Further reading 

 "Sequence of promenades and bicycle trails from Haifa to Atlit and southwards", a municipal magazine, 2.2011 [Hebrew]
 "Rambam medical center, open space as a healing landscape", Mivnim magazine, 2.2011 [Hebrew]
 "Haifa, a city facing the seafront" municipal magazine, 1.2011 [Hebrew]
 "Tel-Akko, cultural heritage and an urban recreation area", municipal magazine, 11.2009
 "Haifa, Metronit Yalag Khalutz in Hadar Hacarmel" 8.2009 [Hebrew]
 "The urban revival of the German Colony in Haifa", TOPOS magazine, 8.2009
 "Haifa, Shikmona coast – a natural coast and a national garden at the heart of the city of Haifa", municipal magazine, 8.2009 [Hebrew]
 "A natural coast and a national garden at the heart of the city of Haifa", municipal magazine, 7.2009 [Hebrew]
 "A lesson in reading landscapes", Shalom Am Ha'aretz booklet, tribute conference to the architect Shlomo Aronson, 5.2009 [Hebrew]
 "Highway 6, section 18" Mivnim magazine, 3.2009 [Hebrew]
 "Landscape planning of Israel Cross Highway, section 18", journal of Landscape Architects, 2009 [Hebrew]
 "Revival of Haifa's shore", Haifa shores, an Italian book, 1.2008
 "Haifa, WIZO square", journal of Landscape Architects, 11.2007 [Hebrew]
 "Shikmona coast in Haifa" Mivnim magazine, 3.2007 [Hebrew]
 "Haifa between mountain and sea, Shikmona coast" journal of Landscape Architects, 10.2006 [Hebrew]
 "Landscape Architecture in Israel", Architecture construction design, Moscow, 1.2006
 Nurit Lisovski, Diana Dolev and Nirit Tzur (Eds.), Tavnit Nof (Landscape pattern), the gardens of Lippa Yahalom and Dan Tzur, Bavel publication, 2012 [Hebrew]

External links 

 The Company's Internet site [Greenstein Har-Gil http://www.landscape.org.il]
 Where in Haifa – Hecht Park, Haifa /http://guyshachar.com/content/heb/2010/hecht-park-ido-tadmor.  A tour with Gil Har-Gil on Guy Shachar's site.
 Shachar Raz, Haifa: A park between the railway and the main road  on NRG site Ma'ariv, 3 November 2009

Gallery

Landscape architecture
Architecture firms of Israel